Pink Rose may refer to:

Pachliopta kotzebuea, a species of butterfly
Pink Rose, a Finnish political association
Sabatia angularis, a plant native to the United States
Pink Roses, a late painting by Vincent van Gogh